Vitālijs Maksimenko (born 8 December 1990) is a Latvian professional football defender. He made his international debut for Latvia in 2013, earning over 50 appearances.

Club career

Early career 

As a youth player Vitālijs Maksimenko was a member of his local club Skonto Riga academy. At the age of 13 he moved to Daugava 90. In 2008 Maksimenko was taken to the club's first team Daugava Rīga. That year they became champions of the Latvian First League. Maksimenko made his first team debut in 2009. In mid-season, with nine Latvian Higher League appearances, Maksimenko went on trials with the Russian Premier League clubs Lokomotiv Moscow and CSKA Moscow. CSKA signed him on loan until the end of the season. He played several matches for the club's reserves.

Skonto Riga 

At the start of 2010 Maksimenko began training with the Latvian Higher League club Skonto Riga. Leaving a good impression, he signed a contract with the club on 15 March 2010. Playing 25 matches in his debut season, Maksimenko helped Skonto become the champions of the Latvian Higher League. In 2011 they became the champions of Baltic League, but in 2012 won the Latvian Football Cup. Skonto finished the 2012 season as the runners-up of the league, with Maksimenko being included in both – Latvian Football Federation and sportacentrs.com teams of the tournament. He was also named the best defender of the season, and later on voted the best Skonto Riga player of the season.

Brighton & Hove Albion 

At the end of 2012 Maksimenko went on trial with the English Football League Championship club Brighton & Hove Albion. In spite of interest from other Football League Championship and Premier League clubs, he signed a two-and-a-half-year contract deal with the Seagulls on 5 January 2013, being added to the development squad. He made his only league appearance for Brighton in a 2–1 defeat to Derby County in August 2013.

Yeovil (loan) 
On 18 March 2013, Maksimenko joined Football League One side Yeovil Town on a one-month loan deal. Maksimenko made his Yeovil and Football League debut as a second-half substitute in a 1–0 defeat against Oldham Athletic, on 16 April 2013. On 20 May 2013, Maksimenko appeared as a second-half substitute in the 2013 League One play-off final as Yeovil beat Brentford to earn promotion to the Championship. Maksimenko returned to Brighton having appeared four times for Yeovil.

Kilmarnock (loan) 
On 24 January 2014, Maksimenko joined Scottish Premiership club Kilmarnock on a loan deal lasting until the end of the 2013–14 Scottish Premiership season. He scored his only goal for Kilmarnock in a 2-1 defeat to Partick Thistle.

VVV-Venlo (loan)
On 1 September 2014, it was announced that Maksimenko was sent on loan to Dutch Eerste Divisie side VVV-Venlo until the end of the season.

Bruk-Bet Termalica Nieciecza 
On 30 June 2017 he signed a contract with Polish side Bruk-Bet Termalica Nieciecza.

International career 

Maksimenko has been a member of Latvian under-19 and under-21 levels. On 15 August 2012 he was firstly called up to the Latvia national football team for a friendly match against Montenegro. Maksimenko made his full international debut on 6 February 2013 in a 3–0 friendly match defeat against Japan, coming on as a substitute in the 72nd minute and replacing Vladimirs Kamešs.

International goals 
Score and Result list Latvia's goal tally first

|-
| 1. || 31 March 2015 || Arena Lviv, Lviv, Ukraine ||  ||  ||  || Friendly || 
|}

Honours

Club 

Skonto Riga
 Latvian Higher League: 2010
 Baltic League: 2010–11
 Latvian Cup: 2011–12

Yeovil Town
Football League One play-offs: 2012–13

Olimpija Ljubljana
Slovenian Cup: 2018–19, 2020–21

Individual 
 Best defender of Latvian Higher League: 2012
 Skonto Riga Player of the Season: 2012

References

External links 
 
 
 
 

1990 births
Living people
Footballers from Riga
Latvian people of Ukrainian descent
Latvian footballers
Association football defenders
Latvia youth international footballers
Latvia under-21 international footballers
Latvia international footballers
Latvian expatriate footballers
FK Daugava (2003) players
PFC CSKA Moscow players
Skonto FC players
Brighton & Hove Albion F.C. players
Yeovil Town F.C. players
Kilmarnock F.C. players
VVV-Venlo players
SV Mattersburg players
Bruk-Bet Termalica Nieciecza players
NK Olimpija Ljubljana (2005) players
Omiya Ardija players
FK RFS players
Latvian Higher League players
English Football League players
Scottish Professional Football League players
Eerste Divisie players
Austrian Football Bundesliga players
Ekstraklasa players
Slovenian PrvaLiga players
J2 League players
Expatriate footballers in Russia
Expatriate footballers in England
Expatriate footballers in Scotland
Expatriate footballers in the Netherlands
Expatriate footballers in Austria
Expatriate footballers in Poland
Expatriate footballers in Slovenia
Expatriate footballers in Japan
Latvian expatriate sportspeople in Russia
Latvian expatriate sportspeople in England
Latvian expatriate sportspeople in Scotland
Latvian expatriate sportspeople in the Netherlands
Latvian expatriate sportspeople in Austria
Latvian expatriate sportspeople in Poland